In mathematics, the category number of a mathematician is a humorous construct invented by Dan Freed,  
intended to measure the capacity of that mathematician to stomach the use of higher categories. It is defined as the largest number n such that they can think about n-categories for a half hour without getting a splitting headache.

See also 
 n-category
 Erdős number
 2-category
 Weak n-category

References 

Higher category theory